Vitaliy Raievskiy (born 12 May 1967) is a Ukrainian rower. He competed at the 1992 Summer Olympics and the 1996 Summer Olympics.

References

External links
 

1967 births
Living people
Ukrainian male rowers
Olympic rowers of the Unified Team
Olympic rowers of Ukraine
Rowers at the 1992 Summer Olympics
Rowers at the 1996 Summer Olympics
Sportspeople from Zaporizhzhia